Ousaman Jammeh (born 13 August 1953) is a Gambian politician.

He was educated at the University of Nigeria, Nsukka, at the Finafrica Institute in Milan and the University of East Anglia (MA Rural Development, 1984). He held the post of Gambian Foreign Minister from September 2009 to June 2010, having previously held the post of Energy Minister from May 2008 to September 2009. Redeployed as Energy Minister in June 2010, he also served as Secretary General and Head of the Civil Service in 2011.

References

1953 births
Living people
University of Nigeria alumni
Alumni of the University of East Anglia
Foreign ministers of the Gambia
Government ministers of the Gambia